The St. Louis Cardinals, a professional baseball franchise based in St. Louis, Missouri, compete in the National League (NL) of Major League Baseball (MLB) since 1892.  Before joining the NL, they were also a charter member of the American Association (AA) from 1882 to 1891.  Although St. Louis has been the Cardinals' home city for the franchise's entire existence, they were also known as the Brown Stockings, Browns, and Perfectos.

In 140 seasons, the franchise has won more than 11,000 regular season games and appeared in 31 postseasons while claiming 12 interleague championships, tying one other, and 23 league pennants.  11 of the interleague championships are World Series titles won under the modern format since 1903; the other championship and tie occurred in 1885–1886.  19 of the league pennants are NL pennants, and the other four are AA pennants.  Their 11 World Series titles represent the most in the NL and are second in MLB only to the New York Yankees' 27.

Notable players have defined, in part, the Cardinals' success and history.  Stan Musial owns the most career batting records with 22.  Rogers Hornsby owns the most single-season records with 11.  Bob Gibson owns the most career pitching records with 18.  Silver King owns the most single-season pitching records with nine.

All-time record-holders

Table notes and keys
All statistics: 

Bold denotes still active with the team.

Italic denotes still active but not with the team.

Team records

Single-game

Italics – occurred in extra innings

Single-season

Managers

All-time career individual records

Batting

Note:  1,500 plate appearances (PA) required for rate statistics.

Pitching

Notes:  500 innings pitched (IP) and 50 decisions qualify for career rate statistics.

{| class="wikitable unsortable" style="text-align:center" 
! colspan=6 style=";|All-time career pitching records
|-
!scope="col" style=";|Category
!scope="col" style=";|Record
!scope="col" style=";|2nd place
!scope="col" style=";|3rd place
!scope="col" style=";|4th place
!scope="col" style=";|5th place
|-
| ERA
| 2.46 Ed Karger647 IP
| 2.52 John Tudor881.2 IP
| colspan="3" style="text-align: center;" | 2.67 Dave Foutz (1,457.2 IP),Slim Sallee (1,905.1 IP), Jack Taylor (816 IP)
|-
| Adjusted ERA+
| 146 John Tudor881.2 IP
| 143 Silver King1,432.2 IP
| 139 Ice Box Chamberlain568.2 IP
| colspan="2" style="text-align: center;" | 137 Jack Stivetts (1,051 IP),Cy Young (690.2 IP)
|-
| Wins
| 251 Bob Gibson 
| 210 Jesse Haines 
| 195 Adam Wainwright
| 163 Bob Forsch 
| 153 Bill Sherdel
|-
| Losses
| 174 Bob Gibson
| 158 Jesse Haines
| 136 Bill Doak
| 131 Bill Sherdel
| 127 Bob Forsch
|-
| Winning percentage
| .719 Ice Box Chamberlain64 dec.
| .718 Ted Wilks71 dec.
| .705 John Tudor88 dec.
| .704 Dave Foutz162 dec.
| .700 Silver King (160 dec.),Tony Mullane (50 dec.)
|-
| Games played
| 554 Jesse Haines
| 528 Bob Gibson
| 465 Bill Sherdel
| 457 Adam Wainwright
| 455 Bob Forsch
|-
| Games started
| 482 Bob Gibson
| 401 Bob Forsch
| 390 Adam Wainwright
| 387 Jesse Haines
| 320 Bill Doak
|-
| Innings pitched
| 3,884.1 Bob Gibson
| 3,203.2 Jesse Haines
| 2,658.2 Bob Forsch
| 2,567.1 Adam Wainwright
| 2,450.2 Bill Sherdel
|-
| Complete games
| 255 Bob Gibson
| 209 Jesse Haines
| 198 Ted Breitenstein
| 156 Dave Foutz
| 154 Silver King
|- 
| Shutouts
| 56 Bob Gibson
| 30 Bill Doak
| 28 Mort Cooper
| 25 Harry Brecheen
| 23 Dizzy Dean, Jesse Haines
|-
| Saves
| 217 Jason Isringhausen
| 160 Lee Smith
| 129 Todd Worrell
| 127 Bruce Sutter
| 121 Trevor Rosenthal
|-
| Games finished
| 332 Jason Isringhausen
| 232 Todd Worrell
| 209 Lee Smith
| 203 Bruce Sutter
| 188 Lindy McDaniel
|-
| Hits allowed
| 3,455 Jesse Haines
| 3,279 Bob Gibson
| 2,721 Bill Sherdel
| 2,602 Bob Forsch
| 2,426 Adam Wainwright
|-
| Earned runs allowed
| 1,297 Jesse Haines
| 1,258 Bob Gibson
| 1,085 Bob Forsch
| 992 Bill Sherdel
| 964 Adam Wainwright
|- 
| Strikeouts
| 3,117 Bob Gibson
| 2,147 Adam Wainwright
| 1,095 Dizzy Dean
| 1,085 Chris Carpenter
| 1,079 Bob Forsch
|-
| Bases on balls allowed
| 1,336 Bob Gibson
| 870 Jesse Haines
| 843 Ted Breitenstein
| 780 Bob Forsch
| 740 Bill Doak
|-
| Home runs allowed
| 257 Bob Gibson
| 213 Adam Wainwright
| 204 Bob Forsch
| 165 Jesse Haines
| 152 Larry Jackson
|-
| Hit batsmen
| 102 Bob Gibson
| 80 Adam Wainwright
| 72 Willie Sudhoff
| 68 Silver King 
| 59 Carlos Martínez
|-
| Wild pitches
| 111 Jumbo McGinnis
| 108 Bob Gibson
| 88 Bob Forsch
| 78 Silver King
| 77 Dave Foutz
|-
| Batters faced
| 16,068 Bob Gibson
| 13,624 Jesse Haines
| 11,088 Bob Forsch
| 10,632 Adam Wainwright
| 10,473 Bill Sherdel
|-
| WHIP
| 1.080 John Tudor881.2 IP 
| 1.095 Bob Caruthers1,395 IP
| 1.098 Jumbo McGinnis1,325 IP
| 1.108 Jack Flaherty523.1 IP
| 1.113 Miles Mikolas561.2 IP
|-
| Strikeout-to-walk ratio
| 4.27 Miles Mikolas561.2 IP
| 3.666 Chris Carpenter1,348.2 IP
| 3.272 Bob Tewksbury968.2 IP
| 3.191 Jack Flaherty523.1 IP
| 3.089 Adam Wainwright2,567.1 IP
|-
| Strikeouts per nine innings pitched
| 10.318 Jack Flaherty523.1 IP
| 8.628 Carlos Martínez967 IP
| 8.460 Lance Lynn977.2 IP
| 7.971 Todd Stottlemyre 565.2 IP
| 7.873 Michael Wacha867.2 IP
|-
| Bases on balls per nine innings pitched
| 1.042 Cy Young690.2 IP 
| 1.161 Bob Tewksbury968.2 IP
| 1.379 Jumbo McGinnis1,325 IP
| 1.386 Grover Cleveland Alexander792 IP
| 1.582 Miles Mikolas561.2 IP
|-
| Hits per nine innings pitched
| 6.741 Jack Flaherty523.1
| 7.286 Fred Beebe861 IP
| 7.597 Bob Gibson3,884.1 IP
| 7.630 José DeLeón917.2 IP
| 7.660 Ice Box Chamberlain568.2 IP
|-
|| Home runs per nine innings pitched
| .042' Ed Karger647 IP
| .082 Jumbo McGinnis1,325 IP
| .087 Red Ames827 IP
| .104 Mike O'Neill694.1 IP
| .105 Fred Beebe861 IP
|-
|}

All-time single-season individual records

Batting

Pitching
Notes: 100 IP and 10 decisions qualify for rate statistics.Single-season individual records divided by era

Batting
Note: Minimum 250 plate appearances (PA) for rate statistics for seasons 1882–91.  From 1892–present, the minimum number of PA is 300.  Minimum 16 stolen base attempts qualifies for stolen base percentage.  Since 1951 only.Pitching

Single-game individual recordsIncludes both regular season and postseason games.Batting

**George Harper, Mark McGwire (3×), Johnny Mize (4×), Stan Musial (2×), Albert Pujols (4×), Reggie Smith, George Watkins, Paul Goldschmidt, and Bill White.

Pitching

Pitchers with nine SO in a postseason game: Andy Benes, Paul Derringer, Gibson (2×), Michael Wacha, Wainwright, Jeff Weaver, and Woody Williams.

Fielding records

Note: 2,000 innings minimum for position players' fielding percentage; 500 innings for pitchers.See also
 Major League Baseball titles leaders
 List of Major League Baseball individual streaks
 Baseball statistics

References
General 
 St. Louis Cardinals top 10 batting leaders. Baseball-Reference.com. Retrieved November 8, 2013.
 St. Louis Cardinals top 10 pitching leaders. Baseball-Reference.com.'' Retrieved November 8, 2013.

In-line citations

Records
St. Louis